The 2021–22 Washington State Cougars women's basketball team represented Washington State University during the 2021–22 NCAA Division I women's basketball season. The Cougars were led by fourth-year head coach Kamie Ethridge and they played their home games at Beasley Coliseum as members of the Pac-12 Conference.

Previous season
Last season, the Cougars finished with an overall record of 12–12. The Cougars finished conference play with a 9–10 record. As the #7 seed in the tournament, the Cougars defeated the #10 seed Utah Utes in the first round, but lost to the #2 seed Arizona Wildcats in the quarterfinals. The Cougars received an at large bid to the 2021 NCAA Division I women's basketball tournament. They received the #9 seed in the Mercado Regional. They lost in the first round to the #8 seed South Florida and were eliminated.

Roster

Schedule

|-
!colspan=9 style=| Exhibition

|-
!colspan=9 style=| Regular Season

|-
!colspan=9 style=| Pac-12 Women's Tournament

|-
!colspan=9 style=| NCAA tournament

Source:

Rankings

*The preseason and week 1 polls were the same.^Coaches did not release a week 2 poll.

See also
 2021–22 Washington State Cougars men's basketball team

Notes

References

Washington State Cougars women's basketball seasons
Washington State
Washington State Cougars women's basketball team
Washington State Cougars women's basketball team
Washington State